Hospital Británico de Buenos Aires is a hospital in Buenos Aires, Argentina.

Notable patients who have been in the hospital 
 Gordon Stretton, English singer, died on May 3, 1983
 Alberto Laiseca, Argentinian writer, died on February 27, 2017

References

Hospitals in Buenos Aires